Babiana dregei is a species of geophyte in the genus Babiana. It is endemic to the Northern Cape of South Africa.

Conservation status 
Babiana dregei is classified as Least Concern as the population trend is stable.

References

External links 
 
 

Endemic flora of South Africa
Flora of South Africa
Flora of the Cape Provinces
dregei